Dalemead is a hamlet in southern Alberta under the jurisdiction of Rocky View County. It is approximately 35 km (21 mi) southeast of Downtown Calgary and 3.2 km (2.0 mi) south of Highway 22X along a Canadian Pacific Railway line.

History 
Established in 1913 with the CPR line, Dalemead was originally named Strathmead but after some confusion with the nearby Town of Strathmore, the name was changed to Dalemead. The present name is derived from the nearby dale, and the last name of Dr. Ellwood Mead.

Demographics 

The population of Dalemead according to the 2018 municipal census conducted by Rocky View County is 29, an increase from its 2013 municipal census population count of 27.

See also 
List of communities in Alberta
List of hamlets in Alberta

References 

Karamitsanis, Aphrodite (1992). Place Names of Alberta – Volume II, Southern Alberta, University of Calgary Press, Calgary, Alberta. 
Read, Tracey (1983). Acres and Empires – A History of the Municipal District of Rocky View, Calgary, Alberta.

Calgary Region
Designated places in Alberta
Hamlets in Alberta
Rocky View County